Don Napy (1909–1962) was an Argentine screenwriter and film director. He was born in Argentina as Luis Napoleón Duclout. 

After working as a journalist, he moved into the film industry. He made his directorial debut in 1950 and made five films over the following three years including The Path to Crime (1951).

He also narrated the 1954 travelogue Buenos Aires in Relief - the first Argentine 3D film.

Selected filmography

Director
 The Path to Crime (1951)

References

Bibliography
 Elena, Alberto & Lopez, Marina Diaz. The Cinema of Latin America. Columbia University Press, 2013.

External links 
 

1909 births
1962 deaths
Argentine people of French descent
Male screenwriters
Argentine film directors
20th-century Argentine screenwriters
20th-century Argentine male writers